Baoying County is under the administration of Yangzhou, Jiangsu province, China. The northernmost county-level division of Yangzhou City, it borders the prefecture-level cities of Yancheng to the east and Huai'an to the north and west.

Administrative 
Baoying County administers to 14 towns.

Climate

History

Etymology 
Baoying was known as Anyi of Chu zhou (Chu prefecture), where supposedly the divine treasures were found in 762. As auspicious tributes, they were presented to the Emperor Suzong of Tang, and found favour with him. It was a coincidence that the then heir apparent, later Emperor Daizong, was the Prince of Chu. The supposed treasures showed the Heaven was sympathetic to the emperor in the future. Thus, the reign title was changed into Baoying (rough meaning: "the treasures show the sympathy [from the Heaven]"), and the county was also bestowed such a name.

Transportation 
The area is served by Baoying railway station on the Lianyungang–Zhenjiang high-speed railway.

References
  "Illustrated Album of Yangzhou Prefecture", from 1573–1620, has illustrations of Baoying

External links 

County-level divisions of Jiangsu
Yangzhou